Viau is a provincial electoral district in the city of Montreal in Quebec, Canada that elects members to the National Assembly of Quebec. It consists of the Districts of Saint-Michel and François-Perrault (east of Papineau Avenue) in the Borough of Villeray–Saint-Michel–Parc-Extension in Montreal.

It was created for the 1973 election from parts of Dorion, Gouin, Jeanne-Mance and Olier electoral districts.

In the change from the 2001 to the 2011 electoral map, its territory was unchanged.

The riding is named after former Quebec businessman Charles-Théodore Viau, founder of the Biscuits Viau company.

Members of the National Assembly

Election results

* Result compared to Action démocratique

* Result compared to UFP

|-

|-

|-

|No designation
|Yannick Duguay
|align="right"|121
|align="right"|0.45
|align="right"|–
|}

|-

|-

|Socialist Democracy
|Caroline Perron
|align="right"|426
|align="right"|1.59
|align="right"|-3.63
|-

|Innovator
|Patrick Ravet
|align="right"|326
|align="right"|1.22
|align="right"|+0.45

|-
 
|Parti Québécois
|Aurèle Bourassa
|colspan=3|Withdrew
|-
|}

|-
 
|New Democratic
|Paul Montpetit
|align="right"|1,482
|align="right"|5.22
|align="right"|+1.02
|-

|Natural Law
|Pierre Bergeron
|align="right"|291
|align="right"|1.02
|align="right"|–
|-

|Innovator
|Claire Cartier
|align="right"|218
|align="right"|0.77
|align="right"|–
|-
|}

|-
 
|New Democratic
|Raymond Gagnon
|align="right"|954
|align="right"|4.20
|align="right"|+0.86
|-

|Parti indépendantiste
|Manon Robert
|align="right"|409
|align="right"|1.80
|align="right"|–
|-

|-
|}

|-
 
|New Democratic
|Giuseppe Sciortino
|align="right"|864
|align="right"|3.34
|align="right"|–
|-

|Humanist
|Doris Gervais
|align="right"|196
|align="right"|0.76
|align="right"|–

|Christian Socialist
|Jean-François Grenier
|align="right"|204
|align="right"|0.90
|align="right"|–
|-
|}

|-

|-

|Workers Communist
|Luigi D'Alonzo
|align="right"|161
|align="right"|0.53
|align="right"|–
|-

|Workers
|Albani Laporte
|align="right"|107
|align="right"|0.36
|align="right"|–

|}

References

External links
Information
 Elections Quebec

Election results
 Election results (National Assembly)
 Election results (QuébecPolitique)

Maps
 2011 map (PDF)
 2001 map (Flash)
2001–2011 changes (Flash)
1992–2001 changes (Flash)
 Electoral map of Montreal region
 Quebec electoral map, 2011

Provincial electoral districts of Montreal
Quebec provincial electoral districts
Villeray–Saint-Michel–Parc-Extension